Terriers is an American crime comedy-drama noir television series created by Ted Griffin that aired on FX from September 8 to December 1, 2010. The show was canceled by FX on December 6, 2010, after the first season.

Premise
Ex-cop and recovering alcoholic Hank Dolworth partners with his best friend, former criminal Britt Pollack, in an unlicensed private investigation business. The series is set in Ocean Beach, San Diego, California, although it is portrayed as a distinct town, with Dolworth having once been a member of the fictional Ocean Beach Police Department.

Cast

Main cast
Donal Logue as Henry "Hank" Dolworth
Michael Raymond-James as Britt Pollack
Laura Allen as Katie Nichols, Britt's girlfriend
Kimberly Quinn as Gretchen Dolworth, Hank's ex-wife
Jamie Denbo as Maggie Lefferts, Hank's attorney and part-time employer
Rockmond Dunbar as Detective Mark Gustafson, Hank's friend and former partner

Recurring cast
Loren Dean as Jason Adler, Gretchen's fiancé
Karina Logue as Stephanie "Steph" Dolworth, Hank's sister (Karina and Donal Logue are real-life siblings as well)
Alison Elliott as Laura Ross, a muckraking blogger
Michael Gaston as Ben Zeitlin, local attorney
Maximiliano Hernández as Ray, Britt's former criminal associate
Daren Scott as Burke (the "man in the tan suit"), Zeitlin's "muscle"
Alex Fernie as Swift, one of the "Squatters"
Alex Berg as Blodgett, one of the "Squatters"
Todd Fasen as Gunt, one of the "Squatters"
Johnny Sneed as Professor Elliot Owen, Katie's college teacher
Rachel Miner as Eleanor Gosney, daughter of Hank's old drinking buddy
Craig Susser as Detective Ronnie Reynolds, Mark's current partner on the force
Stephen Frejek as Officer Robledo, a fellow cop
Zack Silva as Gavin, Katie's college friend
Christopher Cousins as Robert Lindus, local land developer

Reception
On the review aggregation website Rotten Tomatoes, the series holds an approval rating of 93% with an average rating of 6.7 out of 10, based on 27 reviews. The website's critical consensus reads, "Well-acted and quite funny, Terriers breathes quirky new life into the detective show." Metacritic, which uses a weighted average, assigned the series a score of 75 out of 100 based on 24 critics, indicating "generally favorable reviews."

Time James Poniewozik ranked Terriers at #10 on his top 10 list of television shows in 2010.  The Daily Beast Jace Lacob selected the show as part of his top 10 shows of 2010. HitFixs Alan Sepinwall ranked Terriers at #3 on his top 10 list for 2010 as well as #1 on his list of best new shows of 2010. The A.V. Club ranked it as #7 on their list of best shows of 2010. IGN's Matt Fowler gave the entire season a "10" and called it a "massively gratifying TV experience like no other." IGN also gave Terriers their award for "Best New Series of 2010." The series received a nomination for Outstanding New Program by the Television Critics Association.

Episodes

References

External links

 
 

2010s American comedy-drama television series
2010 American television series debuts
2010 American television series endings
2010s American crime drama television series
English-language television shows
FX Networks original programming
Ocean Beach, San Diego
Serial drama television series
Television shows set in San Diego
Television series by 20th Century Fox Television
Fictional portrayals of the San Diego Police Department
Neo-noir television series